Frankfort is an unincorporated community in Spencer Township, Lucas County, in the U.S. state of Ohio.

History
Variant names of the community were Java and Frankfort Corners. A post office was established under the name Java in 1848, and remained in operation until 1901.

References

Unincorporated communities in Lucas County, Ohio
Unincorporated communities in Ohio